Jones Memorial Library is a specialized genealogy and history research library currently located at 2311 Memorial Avenue in Lynchburg, Virginia.  

The library was founded by Mary Frances Watts Jones in memory of her husband George Morgan Jones. The library opened in June 1908 as the second oldest public library in Virginia. The Library had been the dream of George Morgan Jones, philanthropist and industrialist of Lynchburg, but the dream was never realized in his lifetime. As a memorial to her husband, Mary Frances Watts Jones financed the construction and equipping of the library.
The original Jones Memorial Library historic library building is located at 434 Rivermont Avenue in Lynchburg, Virginia.  It was designed by the local architectural firm of Frye & Chesterman.  It was erected in 1906–07 in the Neo-Classical Revival style. The building was listed on the National Register of Historic Places in 1980.   

In 1966, the Lynchburg Public Library opened and Jones Memorial Library moved to concentrate its collection efforts on genealogical and historical holdings.  As a result, the Jones Memorial Library collections in this area of research are one of the largest in the state. Although the library's primary focus is on the central Virginia area, collections include a wide variety of materials covering the State of Virginia as well as the surrounding states, including county histories and court records, family histories and genealogies, general works on the Civil War, county land tax and personal property tax records, and census records.

In July 1987, Jones Memorial Library moved from the 434 Rivermont Avenue building to its current location at 2311 Memorial Avenue. The library sold the building at 434 Rivermont Avenue in the 1990s. 
The library is currently located at 2311 Memorial Avenue on the second floor of the former Sears building at The Plaza, above the Lynchburg Public Library's main branch. The library is open Tuesday-Saturday for genealogical and archival research.

References

External links
Jones Memorial Library, 434 Rivermont Avenue, Lynchburg, VA: 1 photos, 1 data page, and 1 photo caption page, at Historic American Buildings Survey
Jones Memorial Library website

Historic American Buildings Survey in Virginia
Libraries on the National Register of Historic Places in Virginia
Library buildings completed in 1907
Neoclassical architecture in Virginia
Libraries in Virginia
Buildings and structures in Lynchburg, Virginia
National Register of Historic Places in Lynchburg, Virginia